Anisomyces is a genus of fungi in the family Gnomoniaceae.

References

External links
Anisomyces at Index Fungorum

Gnomoniaceae
Sordariomycetes genera